Daniel Rodriguez (born December 31, 1986) is an American mixed martial artist who competes in the Welterweight division of the Ultimate Fighting Championship. A professional mixed martial artist since 2015, Rodriguez has also competed in Bellator, King of the Cage, and Combate Americas.

Background
According to Rodriguez, he grew up in Los Angeles in a gang affiliated family, alternating between the hood and jail system while continuously getting into fights in both. Without any sports background, Rodriguez began training boxing and eventually mixed martial arts in his mid-twenties.

Mixed martial arts career

Early career
Rodriguez compiled a 7–0 amateur record as a Welterweight from late 2013 to 2015. Rodriguez later began his professional career in 2015, competing mainly in Combate Americas, with a one off fight at Bellator 170. Eventually racking up a 8–1 record, he competed on Dana White's Contender Series 22, however he did not earn a UFC contract through his unanimous decision win against Rico Farrington. Afterwards, he won the Smash Global Welterweight Championship, before he was given a UFC contract.

Ultimate Fighting Championship
Rodriguez made his promotional debut on February 15, 2020 at UFC Fight Night 167 as a late replacement for Ramazan Emeev against Tim Means. Rodriguez won the fight via submission in the second round. This win earned him the Performance of the Night award.

Rodriguez was expected to face Kevin Holland on May 30, 2020 at UFC Fight Night: Woodley vs. Burns .However, On May 26, Holland was forced to withdraw from his scheduled bout with Daniel Rodriguez due to an injury  and he was replaced by promotional newcomer Gabriel Green Rodriguez won the fight via unanimous decision.

Rodriguez was expected to face Takashi Sato on August 22, 2020 at UFC on ESPN 15. Despite making the required weight, Sato was not cleared to fight by Nevada State Athletic Commission medical personnel and he was replaced by Dwight Grant whose opponent, Calen Born, was pulled from the same event for undisclosed reason. After being knocked down in the beginning of the fight, Rodriguez knocked Grant down multiple times enroute to a first-round knockout win.

Rodriguez was expected to face Bryan Barberena on November 14, 2020 at UFC Fight Night 183. However, Barberena underwent an emergency laparotomy a week before the event, resulting in the fight being cancelled.

Rodriguez instead faced Nicolas Dalby, replacing Orion Cosce, on November 21, 2020 at UFC 255. He lost the close fight via unanimous decision. 9 out of 20 media outlets scored the fight for Rodriguez.

Rodriguez faced Mike Perry on April 10, 2021 at UFC on ABC 2. He won the bout via unanimous decision.

Rodriguez was scheduled to face Abubakar Nurmagomedov on July 17, 2021 at UFC on ESPN 26.  However, Nurmagomedov was forced to withdraw from the event, citing injury. He was replaced by promotional newcomer Preston Parsons. Rodriguez won the fight via technical knockout in round one.

Rodriguez faced Kevin Lee on August 28, 2021, at UFC on ESPN: Barboza vs. Chikadze. He won the fight via unanimous decision.

Rodriguez was scheduled to face Kevin Holland on September 10, 2022, at UFC 279 in a 180-pound catchweight bout. However, the day of the weigh-ins, Khamzat Chimaev missed weight for his welterweight main event bout with Nate Diaz by seven-and-a-half pounds. As a result, the UFC was forced to change the card around. Rodriguez instead faced Li Jingliang, who was originally scheduled to face Tony Ferguson in the co-main event in a welterweight bout. Rodriguez's bout with Jingliang remained at a 180-pound catchweight. He won the back-and-forth fight via split decision.  21 out of 23 media scores gave it to Jingliang.

Rodriguez was scheduled to face Neil Magny on October 15, 2022 at UFC Fight Night 212. However, Rodriguez withdrew from the bout due to elbow infection. The bout was rescheduled for UFC Fight Night 214 on November 5. He lost the fight via D'Arce choke submission in the third round.

Rodriguez was scheduled to face  Gunnar Nelson on March 18, 2023, at UFC 286. However, Rodriguez withdrew from the event for undisclosed reasons and he was replaced by Bryan Barberena.

Championships and accomplishments

Mixed martial arts
Smash Global
Smash Global Welterweight Championship (One time)
Ultimate Fighting Championship
Performance of the Night (One time)

Mixed martial arts record

|-
|Loss
|align=center|17–3
|Neil Magny
|Submission (D'Arce choke)
|UFC Fight Night: Rodriguez vs. Lemos
|
|align=center|3
|align=center|3:32
|Las Vegas, Nevada, United States
|
|-
|Win
|align=center|17–2
|Li Jingliang
|Decision (split)
|UFC 279
|
|align=center|3
|align=center|5:00
|Las Vegas, Nevada, United States
|
|-
|Win
|align=center|16–2
|Kevin Lee
|Decision (unanimous)
|UFC on ESPN: Barboza vs. Chikadze
|
|align=center|3
|align=center|5:00
|Las Vegas, Nevada, United States
|
|-
|Win
|align=center|15–2
|Preston Parsons
|TKO (punches)
|UFC on ESPN: Makhachev vs. Moisés
|
|align=center|1
|align=center|3:47
|Las Vegas, Nevada, United States
|
|-
|Win
|align=center|14–2
|Mike Perry
|Decision (unanimous)
|UFC on ABC: Vettori vs. Holland
|
|align=center|3
|align=center|5:00
|Las Vegas, Nevada, United States
|
|-
|Loss
|align=center|13–2
|Nicolas Dalby
|Decision (unanimous)
|UFC 255
|
|align=center|3
|align=center|5:00
|Las Vegas, Nevada, United States
|
|-
|Win
|align=center|13–1
|Dwight Grant
|KO (punches)
|UFC on ESPN: Munhoz vs. Edgar
|
|align=center|1
|align=center|2:24
|Las Vegas, Nevada, United States
|
|-
|Win
|align=center|12–1
|Gabriel Green
| Decision (unanimous)
|UFC on ESPN: Woodley vs. Burns
|
|align=center|3
|align=center|5:00
|Las Vegas, Nevada, United States
|
|-
|Win
|align=center|11–1
|Tim Means
|Submission (guillotine choke)
|UFC Fight Night: Anderson vs. Błachowicz 2 
|
|align=center|2
|align=center|3:37
|Rio Rancho, New Mexico, United States
|
|-
| Win
| align=center| 10–1
|Quinton McCottrell
|TKO (punches)
|SMASH Global 9: Black Tie Fight Night
|
|align=center|2
|align=center|1:48
|Hollywood, California, United States
| 
|-
| Win
| align=center| 9–1
|Rico Farrington
|Decision (unanimous)
| Dana White's Contender Series 22
| 
| align=center| 3
| align=center| 5:00
| Las Vegas, Nevada, United States
|
|-
| Win
| align=center| 8–1
| Ivan Castillo
| KO (knee)
| Combate 31: México vs. USA
| 
| align=center| 2
| align=center| 2:31
| Fresno, California, United States
| 
|-
| Win
| align=center| 7–1
| Ozzie Alvarez
| TKO (punches)
| Combate 25: Camino a Copa Combate
| 
| align=center| 3
| align=center| 2:41
| Long Beach, California, United States
| 
|-
| Win
| align=center| 6–1
| Alex Velasco
| Submission (rear-naked choke)
| Combate 23: México vs. El Mundo
| 
| align=center| 3
| align=center| 2:41
| Tijuana, Baja California, Mexico
| 
|-
| Win
| align=center| 5–1
| Justin Baesman
| TKO (punches)
| CXF 11: Alpha Dog
| 
| align=center| 2
| align=center| 1:17
| Studio City, California, United States
| 
|-
| Loss
| align=center| 4–1
| Victor Reyna
| Decision (split)
| Combate 19: Queen Warriors
| 
| align=center| 3
| align=center| 5:00
| San Antonio, Texas, United States
| 
|-
| Win
| align=center| 4–0
| Joel Champion
| TKO (punches)
| Combate 13
| 
| align=center| 1
| align=center| 1:55
| Tucson, Arizona, United States
| 
|-
| Win
| align=center| 3–0
| Christian Gonzalez
| TKO (punches)
| Bellator 170
| 
| align=center| 2
| align=center| 3:55
| Inglewood, California, United States
| 
|-
| Win
| align=center| 2–0
| Hector Saldaña
| Submission (arm-triangle choke)
| Combate 8
| 
| align=center| 1
| align=center| 3:45
| Los Angeles, California, United States
| 
|-
| Win
| align=center| 1–0
| Christopher Gates
| Submission (armbar)
| KOTC: Sanctioned
| 
| align=center| 1
| align=center| 4:54
| San Jacinto, California, United States
|

Professional boxing record

See also 
 List of current UFC fighters
 List of male mixed martial artists

References

External links 
  
 

1986 births
Living people
American male mixed martial artists
American mixed martial artists of Mexican descent
Welterweight mixed martial artists
Mixed martial artists utilizing boxing
Mixed martial artists utilizing Brazilian jiu-jitsu
Mixed martial artists from California
Ultimate Fighting Championship male fighters
American male boxers
American boxers of Mexican descent
Boxers from California
American practitioners of Brazilian jiu-jitsu
Sportspeople from Alhambra, California